Milton Giles Hill (born August 22, 1965) is a retired Major League Baseball pitcher. He played four seasons at the major league level for the Cincinnati Reds, Atlanta Braves, and Seattle Mariners. He was drafted by the Reds in the 28th round of the 1987 amateur draft. Hill played his first professional season with their Class A Cedar Rapids Reds in 1988, and his last with the Baltimore Orioles' Double-A Bowie Baysox in 1996.

References
"Milt Hill Statistics". The Baseball Cube. 20 January 2008.
"Milt Hill Statistics". Baseball-Reference. 20 January 2008.

1965 births
Living people
Cincinnati Reds players
Atlanta Braves players
Seattle Mariners players
Tampa Bay Devil Rays scouts
Tampa Bay Rays scouts
Major League Baseball pitchers
Baseball players from Atlanta
Nashville Sounds players
Georgia Perimeter Jaguars baseball players
Billings Mustangs players
Bowie Baysox players
Calgary Cannons players
American expatriate baseball players in Canada
Carolina Mudcats players
Cedar Rapids Reds players
Chattanooga Lookouts players
Indianapolis Indians players
Jacksonville Suns players